Superfunk is the fourth studio album by Funk, Inc., released in 1973.

Track listing

Personnel
Gene Barr - Tenor saxophone, Vocals
George Bohanon - Trombone
Allen DeRienzo - Trumpet
Cecil Hunt - Conga
Jackie Kelso - Tenor saxophone
Ollie Mitchell - Trumpet
Jimmy Munford - Drums, Vocals
Don Peak - Guitar
Bobby Watley - Organ, Vocals
Johnny "Guitar" Watson - Bass (Electric)
Steve Weakley - Guitar

Charts

References

External links
 Funk,Inc – Superfunk at Discogs

1973 albums
Funk, Inc. albums
Prestige Records albums
Albums produced by David Axelrod (musician)